Brachmia sitiens is a moth in the family Gelechiidae. It was described by Edward Meyrick in 1918. It is found in southern India.

The wingspan is 18–19 mm. The forewings are light greyish-ochreous irrorated with rather dark fuscous. The stigmata is cloudy, dark fuscous, the plical somewhat before the first discal. There is a faint irregular transverse shade from the second to the dorsum and there are traces of cloudy submarginal dots around the apex and termen. The hindwings are pale grey.

References

Moths described in 1918
Brachmia
Taxa named by Edward Meyrick
Moths of Asia